Renegade Gentleman  is an album by Larry Carlton that was released by GRP in 1993.

Track listing

Personnel
 Larry Carlton – guitar
 Chuck Leavell – keyboards
 Matt Rollings – keyboards
 Michael Rhodes – bass guitar
 John Ferraro – drums
 Chris Layton – drums
 Terry McMillan – harmonica, percussion

References

1993 albums
Larry Carlton albums